This was the first edition of the tournament.

Enzo Couacaud and Andrew Harris won the title after defeating Ruben Gonzales and Reese Stalder 6–4, 6–2 in the final.

Seeds

Draw

References

External links
 Main draw

Georgia's Rome Challenger - Doubles